Stenomeris is a genus of plants in the family Dioscoreaceae. It has two known species, native to Southeast Asia. Older systems such as that of Hutchinson placed Stenomeris as the type genus of the family Stenomeridaceae, order Dioscoreales (Stenomeridaceae J. Agardh, nom. cons.).

 Stenomeris borneensis Oliv. - Borneo, Malaysia, Sumatra, Mindanao
 Stenomeris dioscoreifolia Planch. - Philippines

References

Dioscoreales genera
Dioscoreaceae
Taxa named by Jules Émile Planchon